Yeröö is a sum (district) of Selenge Province in northern Mongolia. Bugant urban-type settlement is 66 km SE from Yeröö sum center. In 2008, its population was 5,792.

References 

Populated places in Mongolia
Districts of Selenge Province